The Vision of the Anointed (1995) is a book by economist and political columnist Thomas Sowell which brands the anointed as promoters of a worldview concocted out of fantasy impervious to any real-world considerations.
Sowell asserts that these thinkers, writers, and activists continue to be revered even in the face of evidence disproving their positions.

Sowell argues that American thought is dominated by a "prevailing vision" which seals itself off from any empirical evidence that is inconsistent with that vision.

The book challenges people Sowell refers to as "Teflon prophets," who predict that there will be future social, economic, or environmental problems in the absence of government intervention (Ralph Nader is one of his foremost examples).

The book was initially published in 1995 by Basic Books. It was described as a "masterpiece" by Nick Cater.

References

1995 non-fiction books
Basic Books books
Books by Thomas Sowell
Books in political philosophy